The 2002–03 Slovenian PrvaLiga season started on 14 July 2002 and ended on 1 June 2003. Each team played a total of 31 matches.

League table

Results

Matches 1–22

Matches 23–33

Top goalscorers 

Source: PrvaLiga.si

See also
2002–03 Slovenian Football Cup
2002–03 Slovenian Second League

References
General

Specific

External links
Official website of the PrvaLiga 

Slovenian PrvaLiga seasons
Slovenia
1